Zhang Bin (born 5 February 1973) is a Chinese equestrian rider. He competed in the individual and team jumping events at the 2008 Summer Olympics. He also came first in the 2005 National Games in the same competitions.

References

1973 births
Living people
Chinese male equestrians
Equestrians at the 2008 Summer Olympics
Olympic equestrians of China
Sportspeople from Shanghai
Show jumping riders
Equestrians at the 2006 Asian Games
Equestrians at the 2010 Asian Games
Asian Games competitors for China